Events from the year 1590 in art.

Events
Gian Paolo Lomazzo produces his critical treatise Idea del tempio della pittura ("The ideal temple of painting").

Works

 Federico Barocci - Christ and Mary Magdalen (Noli me tangere)
 Annibale Carracci
Assumption of the Virgin (Museo del Prado, Madrid)
The Beaneater (latest likely date)
 Antonio Circignani - Frescoes of the finding of the True Cross (Basilica of Santa Croce in Gerusalemme, Rome)
 Hendrick de Clerck - Anne with the Virgin and Child (for Kapellekerk, Brussels; now in Royal Museums of Fine Arts of Belgium there, inventory 53)
 Lavinia Fontana - Portrait of Gerolamo Mercuriale (approximate date)
 School of Fontainebleau - Gabrielle d'Estrees with a Sister
 Palma il Giovane - Francesco St Jerome, rare oil painting on copper
 Hasegawa Tōhaku - Shōrin-zu byōbu "Pine Trees" inkwash
 Cornelis van Haarlem – The Fall of the Titans (1588–1590)
 Crispin van den Broeck - Two Young Men

Births
March 25 (bapt.) - Andries van Eertvelt, Flemish Baroque painter, primarily sea scenes (died 1652)
December 3 - Daniel Seghers, Jesuit brother and Flemish Baroque painter who specialized in flower still lifes (died 1661)
date unknown
Bartholomeus van Bassen, Dutch painter (died 1652)
Jacopo Barbello, Italian painter (died 1656)
Didier Barra, French Renaissance painter (died 1656)
Christoffel van den Berghe, Dutch painter of the Baroque period (died 1645)
Gregorio Bausá, Spanish painter (died 1656)
Juan Bautista de Espinosa, Spanish still life painter (died 1641)
Luciano Borzone, Italian painter with an antique style (died 1645)
Giovanni Bernardo Carlone, Italian painter of the late-Mannerist and early-Baroque periods (died 1630)
Bartolomeo Cavarozzi, Italian caravaggisti painter of the Baroque period active in Spain (died 1625)
Giovanni Battista Coriolano, Italian engraver (died 1649)
Felipe Diricksen, Spanish Baroque painter primarily of portraits and religious paintings (died 1679)
Giovanni Battista Discepoli, crippled Italian painter (died 1660)
Caterina Ginnasi, Italian painter of altarpieces for the church of Santa Lucia alle Botteghe Oscure (died 1660)
Michel Lasne, French engraver, draughtsman and collector (died 1667)
Floris van Schooten, Dutch painter (died 1655)
Raffaello Vanni, Italian painter for churches (died 1657)
Cornelis Verbeeck, Dutch painter (died 1637)
probable
Angelica Veronica Airola, Italian painter (died 1670)
Camillo Berlinghieri, Italian painter of the Baroque period (died 1635)
Giovanni Campino, Italian painter from Camerino (died 1650)
Abraham de Vries, Dutch painter (died 1655)
Paolo Domenico Finoglia, Italian painter of the early-Baroque period (died 1645)
Esteban March, Spanish painter (died 1660)
Daniël Mijtens, Dutch portrait painter (died 1647/1648)
Mario Righetti, Italian painter active in his native Bologna (d. unknown)

Deaths
February 3 - Germain Pilon, French sculptors of the French Renaissance (born 1537)
April 22 - Sigmund Feyerabend, German bookseller and wood-engraver (born 1528)
July 22 - Leone Leoni, Italian sculptor and medallist (born 1509)
October 12 - Kanō Eitoku, Japanese painter of the Azuchi-Momoyama period, patriarchs of the Kanō school of Japanese painting (born 1543)
October 29 - Dirck Coornhert, Dutch writer, engraver, philosopher, translator, politician and theologian (born 1522)
November 8 - Joost Janszoon Bilhamer, Dutch sculptor, engraver, and cartographer (born 1521)
date unknown
Cesare Baglioni, Italian painter specializing in quadratura (born 1525)
Miguel Barroso, Spanish painter (born 1538)
Wouter Crabeth I, Dutch glass painter (born 1510)
Bernaert de Rijckere, Flemish painter (born 1535)
Jacob Grimmer, Flemish landscape painter (born 1526)
Girolamo Lombardo, Italian sculptor (born 1506)
Domenico Poggini, Italian sculptor and engraver (born 1520)
Marietta Robusti, Venetian painter of the Renaissance period (born 1560)
probable - Marcus Gheeraerts the Elder, Flemish printmaker and painter associated with the English court of the mid-16th Century (born 1520)

 
Years of the 16th century in art